Charles M. Holton (May 25, 1838 – August 25, 1899) was an American soldier who fought with the Union Army in the American Civil War. Holton received his country's highest award for bravery during combat, the Medal of Honor, for actions taken on July 14, 1863 during the Battle of Williamsport.

Early life
Holton was born in Potter, New York but as a young man moved to Battle Creek, Michigan around 1860. His brother, Samuel, had moved to Michigan earlier to establish his medical practice. Holton earned a law degree and began practicing in Battle Creek before the onset of the Civil War.

Civil War service
Holton enlisted with the 7th Michigan Cavalry during the onset of the American Civil War. His company was present in many major battles, including the Battle of Gettysburg, and the Battle of Williamsport where he earned the Medal of Honor for capturing the enemy's colors.

Medal of Honor citation

Personal life
Holton married Mary Thisler of Constantine, Michigan in 1864.

References

External links
Charles Horton on Find A Grave

1838 births
1899 deaths
American Civil War recipients of the Medal of Honor
People of New York (state) in the American Civil War
United States Army Medal of Honor recipients
Union Army officers